Santa Inês is a Belo Horizonte Metro station on Line 1. It was opened in December 1994 as a one-station extension of the line from Horto. In April 1997 the line was extended to Minas Shopping. The station is located between Horto and José Cândido da Silveira.

References

Belo Horizonte Metro stations
1994 establishments in Brazil
Railway stations opened in 1994